Coal Valley may refer to:
Coal Valley, Illinois
Coal Valley, Iowa
Coal Valley (Nevada), a valley in Nevada
Coal Valley, West Virginia
Coal Valley Township, Rock Island County, Illinois